Diego Gustavo Mondino (born 14 November 1994) is an Argentine professional footballer who plays as a defender for Gimnasia y Esgrima.

Career
Mondino made his debut in senior football at the age of seventeen with Sportivo Belgrano, appearing in two matches for the club in Torneo Argentino A. In 2013, Mondino joined Primera División side Atlético de Rafaela. However, he departed two years later after no appearances. Defensores de Belgrano of tier three subsequently signed Mondino. He scored his first goal in September 2015 against Juventud Unida Universitario. Further goals for them came versus General Belgrano, Agropecuario and Alvarado. Mondino moved to Gimnasia y Esgrima in August 2017. His first season, 2017–18, ended with promotion.

He made his bow in professional football with Gimnasia y Esgrima, with the defender starting a Primera B Nacional fixture with Los Andes on 1 February 2019.

Career statistics
.

References

External links

1994 births
Living people
People from San Francisco, Córdoba
Argentine footballers
Association football defenders
Torneo Argentino A players
Torneo Federal A players
Primera Nacional players
Sportivo Belgrano footballers
Atlético de Rafaela footballers
Defensores de Belgrano de Villa Ramallo players
Gimnasia y Esgrima de Mendoza footballers
Sportspeople from Córdoba Province, Argentina